The 1916 Northwestern Purple football team was an American football team that represented Northwestern University during the 1916 college football season. In its third season under head coach Fred J. Murphy, the team compiled a 6–1 record and finished in second place in the Western Conference. The team's sole loss was to conference champion Ohio State.

Schedule

References

Northwestern
Northwestern Wildcats football seasons
Northwestern Purple football